Joshua ben Sie also known as Jesus ben Sie was a Jewish High Priest of Israel at the end of the 1st century BC.  He replaced Eleazar ben Boethus from 3 BC.

References

1st-century BCE High Priests of Israel